Micropeza corrigiolata is a species of stilt-legged flies  in the family Micropezidae.

Distribution and habitat
This species is present in most of Europe, in the Near East, and in the Nearctic realm. These flies mainly inhabit meadows, fields, bushes, areas with leguminous plants, sparse vegetation and margins of sandy beaches.

Description

These small and slender flies have a deep black body with a bullet-shaped head, reddish eyes  and stilt-like legs. Also their abdomen is long and slender. The tergites have narrow, yellow edges. Antennae are black. Tibiae show short bristles. Wings are clear.

Biology
Adults can be found from the beginning of June to the beginning of August. They mainly feed on small insects. Larvae feed on roots of various plants (Pisum arvense, Trifolium pratense, Medicago sativa).

References

External links
 
 
 Galerie-insecte
 Mic-UK: Six whole mount insect slides

Micropezidae
Articles containing video clips
Insects described in 1767
Taxa named by Carl Linnaeus